Vijai Sagar Sanctuary is located in Mahoba District of Uttar Pradesh. Vijai Sagar Wildlife Sanctuary was founded in 1990.

Getting there
The nearest railway and bus stations are located at Mahoba about 4 km from the sanctuary.

Attractions
Jackal, mongoose, wildcat and various local and migratory birds occupy the 3 km2 of area. The ideal time to visit is from December to February.

External links
http://www.unep-wcmc.org/wdpa/sitedetails.cfm?siteid=308598&level=nat
http://www.india9.com/i9show/Vijai-Sagar-Wildlife-Sanctuary-46601.htm

Wildlife sanctuaries in Uttar Pradesh
Tourist attractions in Mahoba district
1990 establishments in Uttar Pradesh
Protected areas established in 1990